Frank Brown (April 16, 1937 – June 4, 2016) was an American alpine skier. He competed in the men's slalom at the 1960 Winter Olympics.

References

1937 births
2016 deaths
American male alpine skiers
Olympic alpine skiers of the United States
Alpine skiers at the 1960 Winter Olympics
Sportspeople from Boise, Idaho
20th-century American people